Rani Durgavati (5 October 1524 – 24 June 1564) was the ruling Queen of Gondwana from 1550 until 1564. She was married to Dalpat Shah  the son of the king Sangram Shah of the Garha Kingdom. Kingdom  = Gondwana Royal
Gotra   = Marabi
Writer=    birbal Singh Armo

Life
She was born in the family of Chandel Rajput king Salibahan at the fort of Mahoba. 

In 1542, she was married to Dalpat Shah, the  son of the king Sangram Shah of the Garha Kingdom. According to Abul Fazl, Dalpat Shah was the son of a Kachhwaha Rajput adopted by the Raja of Garha Mandla. The Chandel of mahoba and Rajgonds of Garha Kingdom dynasty (Garha Mandla) dynasties were allied because of this marriage.

Queen regnant
Dalpat Shah died in 1550 and due to the young age of Vir Narayan, Durgavati took the reins of the Gondwana kingdom. Diwan Beohar Adhar Simha and Minister Man Thakur helped the Rani in looking after the administration successfully and effectively. Rani Durgavati promoted peace, trade, and good will throughout her realm

Rani Durgavati moved her capital to Chauragarh in place of Singorgarh fort. It was a fort of strategic importance situated on the Satpura hill range

After the death of Sher Shah Suri, Shuja Khan captured Malwa and was succeeded by his son Baz Bahadur in 1556. After ascending to the throne, Baz attacked Rani Durgavati but the attack was repulsed

War with the Mughal
In 1562, Akbar vanquished the Malwa ruler Baz Bahadur and conquered Malwa, made it a Mughal dominion. Consequently, the state boundary of the Rani touched the Mughal Empire. Rani's contemporary was a Mughal General, Khwaja Abdul Majid Asaf Khan, an ambitious man who vanquished Ramchandra, the ruler of Rewa. The prosperity of Rani Durgavati's state lured him and he invaded Rani's state after taking permission from Mughal emperor Akbar.

When Rani heard about the attack by Asaf Khan she decided to defend her kingdom with all her might although her Diwan Beohar Adhar Simha (Adhar Kayastha) pointed out the strength of Mughal forces. Rani maintained that it was better to die respectfully than to live a disgraceful life.

To fight a defensive battle, she went to Narrai, situated between a hilly range on one side and two rivers Gaur and Narmada on the other side. It was an unequal battle with trained soldiers and modern weapons in multitude on the Mughal side and a few untrained soldiers with old weapons on the side of Rani Durgavati. Her Faujdar Arjun Das was killed in the battle. Rani then decided to lead the defense herself. As the enemy entered the valley, the soldiers of the Rani attacked them. Both sides lost some men but Rani lost more. 

Rani's domains were very federal and feudal, much more decentralised than a usual non-tribal kingdom. There were fortress districts, which were administrative units, were controlled either directly by the queen or through subordinate feudal lords (jagirdars) and junior rajas. Around half of the villages were in the hands of feudal lords. These local rajas recruited and contributed much of the soldiers, and also contributed arms to the sovereign Rani during the times of war. The recruitment standards, training and equipment of these soldiers were not uniform, and were often substandard. Also, the feudal lords held much sway over sections of the army during a war. This decentralized structure created disadvantages during the war against mighty Mughals.

At this stage, Rani reviewed her strategy with her counselors. She wanted to continue the attacks on the Mughals in the night, but her chiefs discouraged her and insisted that she took on the army in open combat in nightlight. But by the next morning, Asaf khan summoned big guns. Rani rode on her elephant Sarman and came for the battle. Her son Vir Narayan also took part in this battle. He forced the Mughal army to move back three times but at last, he got wounded and had to retire to a safe place. In the course of the battle, Rani also got injured badly near her ear with an arrow. Another arrow pierced her neck and she lost consciousness. On regaining consciousness she perceived that defeat was imminent. Her mahout advised her to leave the battlefield but she refused and took out her dagger and killed herself on 24 June 1564.  Her martyrdom day (24 June 1564) is even today commemorated as "Balidan Diwas"

Legacy
The Madan Mahal fort Jabalpur is well associated with Rani Durgavati and her son Veer Narayan.

In 1983, the Government of Madhya Pradesh renamed the University of Jabalpur as Rani Durgavati Vishwavidyalaya in her memory.

The government of India issued a postal stamp commemorating her death, on 24 June 1988.

The train between Jabalpur Junction and Jammutawi is known as Durgavati Express (11449/11450) after the name of the Queen.

Indian Coast Guard on 14 July 2018 commissioned ICGS Rani Durgavati, the third Inshore Patrol Vessel (IPV) of its kind.

See also
 Chand Bibi
 Kittur Chennamma
 Rani of Jhansi
 Rudrama Devi

References

https://www.magadhuniversity.ac.in/download/econtent/pdf/Satish%20Chandra%20-%20History%20of%20Medieval%20India%20(2018,%20Orient%20Blackswan)%20-%20libgen.lc.pdf

External links 

1524 births
1564 deaths
History of Madhya Pradesh
People from Madhya Pradesh
Indian military personnel who committed suicide
Indian women in war
Regents of India
Women in 16th-century warfare
People from Banda district, India
16th-century Indian women
16th-century Indian people
16th-century women rulers
Indian queen consorts
Hindu monarchs
Rajput rulers
Suicides in India
16th-century suicides